The Tanarctidae are a family of tardigrades. The family was named and described by Reinhardt Møbjerg Kristensen and Jeanne Renaud-Mornant in 1980.

Genera
There are three genera:
 Actinarctus Schulz, 1935
 Tanarctus Renaud-Debyser, 1959
 Zioella Renaud-Mornant, 1987

References

Further reading
Renaud-Mornant, (1980), Description de trois espèces nouvelles du genre Tanarctus Renaud-Debyser, 1959, et création de la sous-famille des Tanarctinae, subfam. nov. (Tardigrada, Heterotardigrada).' (Description of Three New Species of the Genus Tanarctus'') Bulletin of the National Natural History Museum (Bulletin du Museum National d'Histoire Naturelle), Section A: Zoology, Biology and Animal, vol. 2, no 1, p. 129-141.

Arthrotardigrada
Tardigrade families